Gladiolus 'Atom' is a cultivar of Gladiolus which was introduced in 1946.

See also 
 List of Gladiolus varieties

References
Heirloom Flowers

Atom
Ornamental plant cultivars